The 5th Women's European Amateur Boxing Championships were held in Warsaw, Poland from September 4 to 10, 2006.
This edition of the recurring competition was organised by the European governing body for amateur boxing, EABA.
Competitions took place in 13 weight classes.

Russia topped the medals table, as they had done in the four previous editions of these championships.

Medal table

Medal winners

References

European Amateur Boxing Championships
Boxing
Women's European Amateur Boxing Championships
International boxing competitions hosted by Poland
Sports competitions in Warsaw
September 2006 sports events in Europe
2000s in Warsaw